ITV News Channel TV (referred to as ITV News on Channel on air) is a British television news service for the Channel Islands broadcast and produced by ITV Channel.

Overview
ITV News has its main Channel Islands newsroom in Jersey as well as a smaller bureau in Guernsey, both with reporters and camera crews working seven days a week. The station also has freelance video journalists based on the smaller islands of Alderney and Sark.

There are currently six Channel TV news bulletins produced on weekdays: three during Good Morning Britain (branded as Good Morning Channel on air), a lunchtime news update, the main 6pm evening news (previously called Channel Report) and a shorter late news bulletin after the ITV News at Ten.

There are also two weekend news updates, broadcast early evening on Saturdays and Sundays.

Production

Studios
Channel's news programmes are presented from the ITV Channel studios at Castle Quay in St. Helier, Jersey. There is also a smaller Guernsey studio in St Sampson which is used for live interviews or pre-recorded segments.

The main Channel Report studio was previously based at La Pouquelaye in the north of St. Helier.

Identity
Although Channel Television remained independently owned until 2011, during the 2000s, Channel Report adopted a localised version of the titles, graphics and music used by ITV Plc-produced regional news programmes.

When the Channel Report name was dropped in January 2013 to bring it in line with the other ITV regional programmes, the historical 'Channel TV' name was retained in order to distinguish between the Channel Islands' news service and the 24-hour ITV News Channel that was previously run by ITN between 2000 and 2005.

Since the rebrand, presenters refer to the programme on air as ITV News on Channel or ITV News in the Channel Islands.

Transmission

ITV News Channel TV, and all of Channel's other local programmes, have been produced in 1080i HD since production moved to Castle Quay in 2015. However, as of 2022 viewers in the region can still only watch in 576i standard definition over Freeview & Sky.

Channel publishes the HD version of its nightly news programme on ITV.com shortly after broadcast, making it available to watch for 24 hours.

It also occasionally simulcasts the programme online using Facebook Live, as it does with other special regional programmes to avoid disrupting the network ITV schedule.

Notable presenters and reporters

Current
Jess Dunsdon
Jonathan Wills
Katie Chiang (Good Morning Britain bulletins)

Former
Emma Baker (ITV Anglia)
Paul Brown
Gary Burgess
Murray Dron
Kristina Moore

References

External links

1976 British television series debuts
1970s British television series
1980s British television series
1990s British television series
2000s British television series
2010s British television series
2020s British television series
Channel Islands
English-language television shows
ITV regional news shows
Mass media in Jersey
Television news in Jersey
Television shows produced by Channel Television